This is a list of the mammal species recorded in Bolivia. There are 300 mammal species in Bolivia, of which two are critically endangered, five are endangered, seventeen are vulnerable, and twelve are near threatened.

The following tags are used to highlight each species' conservation status as assessed by the International Union for Conservation of Nature:

Some species were assessed using an earlier set of criteria. Species assessed using this system have the following instead of near threatened and least concern categories:

Subclass: Theria

Infraclass: Eutheria

Order: Cingulata (armadillos)

The armadillos are small mammals with a bony armored shell. They are native to the Americas. There are around 20 extant species.

Family: Dasypodidae (armadillos)
Subfamily: Dasypodinae
Genus: Dasypus
 Greater long-nosed armadillo, D. kappleri 
 Nine-banded armadillo, D. novemcinctus 
 Seven-banded armadillo, D. septemcinctus 
Subfamily: Euphractinae
Genus: Chaetophractus
 Andean hairy armadillo, C. nationi 
 Screaming hairy armadillo, C. vellerosus 
 Big hairy armadillo, C. villosus 
Genus: Calyptophractus
 Greater fairy armadillo, C. retusus 
Genus: Euphractus
 Six-banded armadillo, E. sexcinctus 
Subfamily: Tolypeutinae
Genus: Cabassous
 Southern naked-tailed armadillo, C. unicinctus 
Genus: Priodontes
 Giant armadillo, P. maximus 
Genus: Tolypeutes
 Southern three-banded armadillo, T. matacus

Order: Pilosa (anteaters, sloths and tamanduas)

The order Pilosa is extant only in the Americas and includes the anteaters, sloths, and tamanduas.

Suborder: Folivora
Family: Bradypodidae (three-toed sloths)
Genus: Bradypus
 Brown-throated three-toed sloth, Bradypus variegatus LC
Family: Choloepodidae (two-toed sloths)
Genus: Choloepus
 Hoffmann's two-toed sloth, Choloepus hoffmanni LC
Suborder: Vermilingua
Family: Cyclopedidae
Genus: Cyclopes
 Silky anteater, Cyclopes didactylus LC
Family: Myrmecophagidae (American anteaters)
Genus: Myrmecophaga
 Giant anteater, Myrmecophaga tridactyla NT
Genus: Tamandua
 Southern tamandua, Tamandua tetradactyla LC

Order: Primates

The order Primates contains humans and their closest relatives: lemurs, lorisoids, monkeys, and apes.

Suborder: Haplorhini
Infraorder: Simiiformes
Parvorder: Platyrrhini (New World monkeys)
Family: Cebidae
Subfamily: Callitrichinae
Genus: Callithrix
 Pygmy marmoset, Cebuella pygmaea LC
Genus:Leontocebus
 Brown-mantled tamarin, Leontocebus fuscicollis LC
 Weddell's saddle-back tamarin, Leontocebus weddelli LC
Genus: Saguinus
 Emperor tamarin, Saguinus imperator LC
 White-lipped tamarin, Saguinus labiatus LC
Genus: Callimico
 Goeldi's marmoset, Callimico goeldii NT
Subfamily: Cebinae
Genus: Cebus
 Humboldt's white-fronted capuchin, Cebus albifrons LC
 Shock-headed capuchin, Cebus cuscinus NT
 Spix's white-fronted capuchin, Cebus unicolor
Genus: Saimiri
 Black-capped squirrel monkey, Saimiri boliviensis LC
Family: Aotidae
Genus: Aotus
 Azara's night monkey, Aotus azarae LC
 Black-headed night monkey, Aotus nigriceps LC
Family: Pitheciidae
Subfamily: Callicebinae
Genus: Callicebus
 Brown titi, Callicebus brunneus LC
 White-eared titi, Callicebus donacophilus LC
 Rio Beni titi, Callicebus modestus VU
 Ollala brothers' titi, Callicebus olallae VU
 White-coated titi, Callicebus pallescens LC
Subfamily: Pitheciinae
Genus: Pithecia
 Rio Tapajós saki, Pithecia irrorata LC
Family: Atelidae
Subfamily: Alouattinae
Genus: Alouatta
 Black howler, Alouatta caraya LC
 Bolivian red howler, Alouatta sara LC
 Venezuelan red howler, Alouatta seniculus LC
Subfamily: Atelinae
Genus: Ateles
 Peruvian spider monkey, Ateles chamek LC
Genus: Lagothrix
 Gray woolly monkey, Lagothrix cana NT
 Brown woolly monkey, Lagothrix lagothricha LR/lc

Order: Rodentia (rodents)

Rodents make up the largest order of mammals, with over 40% of mammalian species. They have two incisors in the upper and lower jaw which grow continually and must be kept short by gnawing. Most rodents are small though the capybara can weigh up to 45 kg (100 lb).

Suborder: Hystricomorpha
Family: Erethizontidae (New World porcupines)
Subfamily: Erethizontinae
Genus: Coendou
 Bicolor-spined porcupine, Coendou bicolor LR/lc
 Brazilian porcupine, Coendou prehensilis LR/lc
Family: Chinchillidae (viscachas and chinchillas)
Genus: Chinchilla
 Short-tailed chinchilla, Chinchilla brevicaudata CR
Genus: Lagidium
 Southern viscacha, Lagidium viscacia DD
Genus: Lagostomus
 Plains viscacha, Lagostomus maximus LR/lc
Family: Dinomyidae (pacarana)
Genus: Dinomys
 Pacarana, Dinomys branickii EN
Family: Caviidae (guinea pigs)
Subfamily: Caviinae
Genus: Cavia
 Montane guinea pig, Cavia tschudii LR/lc
Genus: Galea
 Common yellow-toothed cavy, Galea musteloides LR/lc
 Spix's yellow-toothed cavy, Galea spixii LR/lc
Genus: Microcavia
 Southern mountain cavy, Microcavia australis LR/lc
 Andean mountain cavy, Microcavia niata LR/lc
Subfamily: Dolichotinae
Genus: Dolichotis
 Chacoan mara, Dolichotis salinicola LR/nt
Family: Dasyproctidae (agoutis and pacas)
Genus: Dasyprocta
 Central American agouti, Dasyprocta punctata LR/lc
Family: Cuniculidae
Genus: Cuniculus
 Lowland paca, Cuniculus paca LC
 Mountain paca, Cuniculus taczanowskii LR/nt
Family: Ctenomyidae
Genus: Ctenomys
 Bolivian tuco-tuco, Ctenomys boliviensis LR/lc
 Conover's tuco-tuco, Ctenomys conoveri LR/lc
 Forest tuco-tuco, Ctenomys frater LR/lc
 White-toothed tuco-tuco, Ctenomys leucodon LR/lc
 Lewis's tuco-tuco, Ctenomys lewisi LR/lc
 Highland tuco-tuco, Ctenomys opimus LR/lc
 Steinbach's tuco-tuco, Ctenomys steinbachi LR/lc
Family: Octodontidae
Genus: Octodontomys
 Mountain degu, Octodontomys gliroides LR/lc
Family: Abrocomidae
Genus: Abrocoma
 Bolivian chinchilla rat, Abrocoma boliviensis VU
 Ashy chinchilla rat, Abrocoma cinerea LR/lc
Family: Echimyidae
Subfamily: Dactylomyinae
Genus: Dactylomys
 Bolivian bamboo rat, Dactylomys boliviensis LR/lc
 Amazon bamboo rat, Dactylomys dactylinus LC
 Montane bamboo rat, Dactylomys peruanus DD
Subfamily: Eumysopinae
Genus: Mesomys
 Ferreira's spiny tree rat, Mesomys hispidus LR/lc
Genus: Proechimys
 Short-tailed spiny rat, Proechimys brevicauda LR/lc
 Long-tailed spiny rat, Proechimys longicaudatus LR/lc
 Simon's spiny rat, Proechimys simonsi LR/lc
 Steere's spiny rat, Proechimys steerei LR/lc
Family: Myocastoridae (coypus)
Genus: Myocastor
 Coypu, Myocastor coypus LR/lc
Suborder: Sciurognathi
Family: Sciuridae (squirrels)
Subfamily: Sciurinae
Tribe: Sciurini
Genus: Sciurus
 Bolivian squirrel, Sciurus ignitus LR/lc
 Southern Amazon red squirrel, Sciurus spadiceus LR/lc
Family: Cricetidae
Subfamily: Sigmodontinae
Genus: Akodon
 Highland grass mouse, Akodon aerosus LR/lc
 White-bellied grass mouse, Akodon albiventer LR/lc
 Azara's grass mouse, Akodon azarae LR/lc
 Bolivian grass mouse, Akodon boliviensis LR/lc
 Day's grass mouse, Akodon dayi LR/lc
 Smoky grass mouse, Akodon fumeus LR/lc
 Thespian grass mouse, Akodon mimus LR/lc
 Altiplano grass mouse, Akodon puer LR/lc
 Cochabamba grass mouse, Akodon siberiae VU
 White-throated grass mouse, Akodon simulator LR/lc
 Puno grass mouse, Akodon subfuscus LR/lc
 Chaco grass mouse, Akodon toba LR/lc
 Variable grass mouse, Akodon varius LR/lc
Genus: Andalgalomys
 Pearson's chaco mouse, Andalgalomys pearsoni LR/lc
Genus: Andinomys
 Andean mouse, Andinomys edax LR/lc
Genus: Auliscomys
 Bolivian big-eared mouse, Auliscomys boliviensis LR/lc
 Painted big-eared mouse, Auliscomys pictus LR/lc
 Andean big-eared mouse, Auliscomys sublimis LR/lc
Genus: Bolomys
 Pleasant bolo mouse, Bolomys amoenus LR/lc
 Rufous-bellied bolo mouse, Bolomys lactens LR/lc
 Hairy-tailed bolo mouse, Bolomys lasiurus LR/lc
Genus: Calomys
 Bolivian vesper mouse, Calomys boliviae LR/lc
 Large vesper mouse, Calomys callosus LR/lc
 Small vesper mouse, Calomys laucha LR/lc
 Andean vesper mouse, Calomys lepidus LR/lc
Genus: Chinchillula
 Altiplano chinchilla mouse, Chinchillula sahamae LR/lc
Genus: Chroeomys
 Andean altiplano mouse, Chroeomys andinus LR/lc
 Jelski's altiplano mouse, Chroeomys jelskii LR/lc
Genus: Eligmodontia
 Andean gerbil mouse, Eligmodontia puerulus LR/lc
Genus: Galenomys
 Garlepp's mouse, Galenomys garleppi LR/lc
Genus: Graomys
 Pale leaf-eared mouse, Graomys domorum LR/lc
 Gray leaf-eared mouse, Graomys griseoflavus LR/lc
Genus: Holochilus
 Wagner's marsh rat, Holochilus sciureus LR/lc
Genus: Kunsia
 Woolly giant rat, Kunsia tomentosus VU
Genus: Lenoxus
 Andean rat, Lenoxus apicalis LR/nt
Genus: Microryzomys
 Forest small rice rat, Microryzomys minutus LR/lc
Genus: Neacomys
 Northern bristly mouse, Neacomys spinosus LR/lc
Genus: Neotomys
 Andean swamp rat, Neotomys ebriosus LR/lc
Genus: Oecomys
 Bicolored arboreal rice rat, Oecomys bicolor LR/lc
 Unicolored arboreal rice rat, Oecomys concolor LR/lc
 Mamore arboreal rice rat, Oecomys mamorae LR/lc
 Robert's arboreal rice rat, Oecomys roberti LR/lc
Genus: Oligoryzomys
 Andean pygmy rice rat, Oligoryzomys andinus LR/lc
 Chacoan pygmy rice rat, Oligoryzomys chacoensis LR/lc
 Destructive rice rat, Oligoryzomys destructor DD
 Small-eared pygmy rice rat, Oligoryzomys microtis LR/lc
Genus: Oryzomys
 Tarija rice rat, Oryzomys legatus LR/lc
 Light-footed rice rat, Oryzomys levipes LR/nt
 Azara's broad-headed rice rat, Oryzomys megacephalus LR/lc
 Elegant rice rat, Oryzomys nitidus LR/lc
 Terraced rice rat, Oryzomys subflavus LR/lc
 Yungas rice rat, Oryzomys yunganus LR/lc
Genus: Oxymycterus
 Quechuan hocicudo, Oxymycterus hucucha VU
 Incan hocicudo, Oxymycterus inca LR/lc
 Paramo hocicudo, Oxymycterus paramensis LR/lc
Genus: Phyllotis
 Capricorn leaf-eared mouse, Phyllotis caprinus LR/lc
 Darwin's leaf-eared mouse, Phyllotis darwini LR/lc
 Bunchgrass leaf-eared mouse, Phyllotis osilae LR/lc
 Wolffsohn's leaf-eared mouse, Phyllotis wolffsohni LR/lc
Genus: Pseudoryzomys
 Brazilian false rice rat, Pseudoryzomys simplex LR/lc
Genus: Rhipidomys
 Southern climbing mouse, Rhipidomys austrinus LR/lc
Genus: Thomasomys
 Daphne's Oldfield mouse, Thomasomys daphne LR/lc
 Ladew's Oldfield mouse, Thomasomys ladewi LR/lc
 Montane Oldfield mouse, Thomasomys oreas LR/lc

Order: Lagomorpha (lagomorphs)

The lagomorphs comprise two families, Leporidae (hares and rabbits), and Ochotonidae (pikas). Though they can resemble rodents, and were classified as a superfamily in that order until the early 20th century, they have since been considered a separate order. They differ from rodents in a number of physical characteristics, such as having four incisors in the upper jaw rather than two.

Family: Leporidae (rabbits, hares)
Genus: Sylvilagus
 Common tapetí, Sylvilagus brasiliensis EN

Order: Chiroptera (bats)

The bats' most distinguishing feature is that their forelimbs are developed as wings, making them the only mammals capable of flight. Bat species account for about 20% of all mammals.

Family: Noctilionidae
Genus: Noctilio
 Lesser bulldog bat, Noctilio albiventris LR/lc
 Greater bulldog bat, Noctilio leporinus LR/lc
Family: Vespertilionidae
Subfamily: Myotinae
Genus: Myotis
 Silver-tipped myotis, Myotis albescens LR/lc
 Hairy-legged myotis, Myotis keaysi LR/lc
 Yellowish myotis, Myotis levis LR/lc
 Black myotis, Myotis nigricans LR/lc
 Montane myotis, Myotis oxyotus LR/lc
 Riparian myotis, Myotis riparius LR/lc
 Velvety myotis, Myotis simus LR/lc
Subfamily: Vespertilioninae
Genus: Eptesicus
 Little black serotine, Eptesicus andinus LR/lc
 Brazilian brown bat, Eptesicus brasiliensis LR/lc
 Argentine brown bat, Eptesicus furinalis LR/lc
Genus: Histiotus
 Big-eared brown bat, Histiotus macrotus LR/nt
 Small big-eared brown bat, Histiotus montanus LR/lc
Genus: Lasiurus
 Desert red bat, Lasiurus blossevillii LR/lc
 Hoary bat, Lasiurus cinereus LR/lc
Family: Molossidae
Genus: Cynomops
 Cinnamon dog-faced bat, Cynomops abrasus LR/nt
 Southern dog-faced bat, Cynomops planirostris LR/lc
Genus: Eumops
 Dwarf bonneted bat, Eumops bonariensis LR/lc
 Wagner's bonneted bat, Eumops glaucinus LR/lc
 Sanborn's bonneted bat, Eumops hansae LR/lc
 Western mastiff bat, Eumops perotis LR/lc
Genus: Molossops
 Dwarf dog-faced bat, Molossops temminckii LR/lc
Genus: Molossus
 Black mastiff bat, Molossus ater LR/lc
 Velvety free-tailed bat, Molossus molossus LR/lc
Genus: Nyctinomops
 Peale's free-tailed bat, Nyctinomops aurispinosus LR/lc
 Broad-eared bat, Nyctinomops laticaudatus LR/lc
 Big free-tailed bat, Nyctinomops macrotis LR/lc
Genus: Promops
 Big crested mastiff bat, Promops centralis LR/lc
 Brown mastiff bat, Promops nasutus LR/lc
Genus: Tadarida
 Mexican free-tailed bat, Tadarida brasiliensis LR/nt
Family: Emballonuridae
Genus: Peropteryx
 Greater dog-like bat, Peropteryx kappleri LR/lc
 Lesser dog-like bat, Peropteryx macrotis LR/lc
Genus: Rhynchonycteris
 Proboscis bat, Rhynchonycteris naso LR/lc
Genus: Saccopteryx
 Greater sac-winged bat, Saccopteryx bilineata LR/lc
 Lesser sac-winged bat, Saccopteryx leptura LR/lc
Family: Mormoopidae
Genus: Pteronotus
 Big naked-backed bat, Pteronotus gymnonotus LR/lc
 Parnell's mustached bat, Pteronotus parnellii LR/lc
 Wagner's mustached bat, Pteronotus personatus LR/lc
Family: Phyllostomidae
Subfamily: Phyllostominae
Genus: Chrotopterus
 Big-eared woolly bat, Chrotopterus auritus LR/lc
Genus: Lonchorhina
 Tomes's sword-nosed bat, Lonchorhina aurita LR/lc
Genus: Lophostoma
 Pygmy round-eared bat, Lophostoma brasiliense LR/lc
 Carriker's round-eared bat, Lophostoma carrikeri VU
 White-throated round-eared bat, Lophostoma silvicolum LR/lc
Genus: Macrophyllum
 Long-legged bat, Macrophyllum macrophyllum LR/lc
Genus: Micronycteris
 Little big-eared bat, Micronycteris megalotis LR/lc
 White-bellied big-eared bat, Micronycteris minuta LR/lc
Genus: Mimon
 Striped hairy-nosed bat, Mimon crenulatum LR/lc
Genus: Phylloderma
 Pale-faced bat, Phylloderma stenops LR/lc
Genus: Phyllostomus
 Pale spear-nosed bat, Phyllostomus discolor LR/lc
 Lesser spear-nosed bat, Phyllostomus elongatus LR/lc
 Greater spear-nosed bat, Phyllostomus hastatus LR/lc
Genus: Tonatia
 Greater round-eared bat, Tonatia bidens LR/lc
 Stripe-headed round-eared bat, Tonatia saurophila LR/lc
Genus: Trachops
 Fringe-lipped bat, Trachops cirrhosus LR/lc
Subfamily: Lonchophyllinae
Genus: Lonchophylla
 Thomas's nectar bat, Lonchophylla thomasi LR/lc
Subfamily: Glossophaginae
Genus: Anoura
 Tailed tailless bat, Anoura caudifer LR/lc
 Handley's tailless bat, Anoura cultrata LR/lc
 Geoffroy's tailless bat, Anoura geoffroyi LR/lc
Genus: Choeroniscus
 Minor long-nosed long-tongued bat, Choeroniscus minor LR/lc
Genus: Glossophaga
 Pallas's long-tongued bat, Glossophaga soricina LR/lc
Genus: Lichonycteris
 Dark long-tongued bat, Lichonycteris obscura LR/lc
Subfamily: Carolliinae
Genus: Carollia
 Silky short-tailed bat, Carollia brevicauda LR/lc
 Chestnut short-tailed bat, Carollia castanea LR/lc
 Seba's short-tailed bat, Carollia perspicillata LR/lc
Genus: Rhinophylla
 Dwarf little fruit bat, Rhinophylla pumilio LR/lc
Subfamily: Stenodermatinae
Genus: Artibeus
 Andersen's fruit-eating bat, Artibeus anderseni LR/lc
 Silver fruit-eating bat, Artibeus glaucus LR/lc
 Jamaican fruit bat, Artibeus jamaicensis LR/lc
 Great fruit-eating bat, Artibeus lituratus LR/lc
 Dark fruit-eating bat, Artibeus obscurus LR/nt
Genus: Chiroderma
 Salvin's big-eyed bat, Chiroderma salvini LR/lc
 Little big-eyed bat, Chiroderma trinitatum LR/lc
 Hairy big-eyed bat, Chiroderma villosum LR/lc
Genus: Enchisthenes
 Velvety fruit-eating bat, Enchisthenes hartii LR/lc
Genus: Mesophylla
 MacConnell's bat, Mesophylla macconnelli LR/lc
Genus: Pygoderma
 Ipanema bat, Pygoderma bilabiatum LR/nt
Genus: Sphaeronycteris
 Visored bat, Sphaeronycteris toxophyllum LR/lc
Genus: Sturnira
 Bogota yellow-shouldered bat, Sturnira bogotensis LR/lc
 Hairy yellow-shouldered bat, Sturnira erythromos LR/lc
 Little yellow-shouldered bat, Sturnira lilium LR/lc
 Greater yellow-shouldered bat, Sturnira magna LR/nt
 Tilda's yellow-shouldered bat, Sturnira tildae LR/lc
Genus: Uroderma
 Tent-making bat, Uroderma bilobatum LR/lc
 Brown tent-making bat, Uroderma magnirostrum LR/lc
Genus: Vampyressa
 Bidentate yellow-eared bat, Vampyressa bidens LR/nt
 Southern little yellow-eared bat, Vampyressa pusilla LR/lc
Genus: Vampyrodes
 Great stripe-faced bat, Vampyrodes caraccioli LR/lc
Genus: Platyrrhinus
 Short-headed broad-nosed bat, Platyrrhinus brachycephalus LR/lc
 Thomas's broad-nosed bat, Platyrrhinus dorsalis LR/lc
 Heller's broad-nosed bat, Platyrrhinus helleri LR/lc
 Buffy broad-nosed bat, Platyrrhinus infuscus LR/nt
 White-lined broad-nosed bat, Platyrrhinus lineatus LR/lc
 Greater broad-nosed bat, Platyrrhinus vittatus LR/lc
Subfamily: Desmodontinae
Genus: Desmodus
 Common vampire bat, Desmodus rotundus LR/lc
Genus: Diaemus
 White-winged vampire bat, Diaemus youngi LR/lc
Genus: Diphylla
 Hairy-legged vampire bat, Diphylla ecaudata LR/nt
Family: Thyropteridae
Genus: Thyroptera
 Peters's disk-winged bat, Thyroptera discifera LR/lc
 Spix's disk-winged bat, Thyroptera tricolor LR/lc

Order: Cetacea (whales)

The order Cetacea includes whales, dolphins and porpoises. They are the mammals most fully adapted to aquatic life with a spindle-shaped nearly hairless body, protected by a thick layer of blubber, and forelimbs and tail modified to provide propulsion underwater.

Suborder: Odontoceti
Superfamily: Platanistoidea
Family: Iniidae
Genus: Inia
 Boto, Inia geoffrensis VU
Family: Delphinidae (marine dolphins)
Genus: Sotalia
 Tucuxi, Sotalia fluviatilis DD

Order: Carnivora (carnivorans)

There are over 260 species of carnivorans, the majority of which feed primarily on meat. They have a characteristic skull shape and dentition.
Suborder: Feliformia
Family: Felidae (cats)
Subfamily: Felinae
Genus: Leopardus
Pampas cat L. colocola 
Geoffroy's cat L. geoffroyi 
Andean mountain cat L. jacobitus
Ocelot L. pardalis 
Oncilla L. tigrinus 
Margay L. wiedii 
Genus: Herpailurus
Jaguarundi, H. yagouaroundi 
Genus: Puma
Cougar, P. concolor 
Subfamily: Pantherinae
Genus: Panthera
Jaguar, P. onca 
Suborder: Caniformia
Family: Canidae (dogs, foxes)
Genus: Lycalopex
 Culpeo, Lycalopex culpaeus LC
 Pampas fox, Lycalopex gymnocercus LC
Genus: Cerdocyon
 Crab-eating fox, Cerdocyon thous LC
Genus: Atelocynus
 Short-eared dog, Atelocynus microtis DD
Genus: Speothos
 Bush dog, Speothos venaticus VU
Genus: Chrysocyon
 Maned wolf, Chrysocyon brachyurus NT
Family: Ursidae (bears)
Genus: Tremarctos
 Spectacled bear, Tremarctos ornatus VU
Family: Procyonidae (raccoons)
Genus: Procyon
 Crab-eating raccoon, Procyon cancrivorus LR/lc
Genus: Nasua
 South American coati, Nasua nasua LR/lc
Genus: Potos
 Kinkajou, Potos flavus LR/lc
Genus: Bassaricyon
 Eastern lowland olingo, Bassaricyon alleni LR/lc
Family: Mustelidae (mustelids)
Genus: Eira
 Tayra, Eira barbara LR/lc
Genus: Galictis
 Lesser grison, Galictis cuja LR/lc
 Greater grison, Galictis vittata LR/lc
Genus: Lontra
 Neotropical river otter, Lontra longicaudis DD
Genus: Neogale
 Long-tailed weasel, Neogale frenata LR/lc
Genus: Pteronura
 Giant otter, Pteronura brasiliensis EN
Family: Mephitidae
Genus: Conepatus
 Molina's hog-nosed skunk, Conepatus chinga LR/lc

Order: Perissodactyla (odd-toed ungulates)

The odd-toed ungulates are browsing and grazing mammals. They are usually large to very large, and have relatively simple stomachs and a large middle toe.

Family: Tapiridae (tapirs)
Genus: Tapirus
 Brazilian tapir, Tapirus terrestris VU

Order: Artiodactyla (even-toed ungulates)

The even-toed ungulates are ungulates whose weight is borne about equally by the third and fourth toes, rather than mostly or entirely by the third as in perissodactyls. There are about 220 artiodactyl species, including many that are of great economic importance to humans.

Family: Tayassuidae (peccaries)
Genus: Catagonus
 Chacoan peccary, C. wagneri EN
Genus: Pecari
 Collared peccary, Dicotyles tajacu LC
Genus: Tayassu
 White-lipped peccary, Tayassu pecari NT
Family: Camelidae (camels, llamas)
Genus: Lama
 Guanaco, Lama guanicoe LR/lc
 Vicuña, Lama vicugna LR/cd
Family: Cervidae (deer)
Subfamily: Capreolinae
Genus: Blastocerus
 Marsh deer, Blastocerus dichotomus VU
Genus: Hippocamelus
 Taruca, Hippocamelus antisensis DD
Genus: Mazama
 Red brocket, Mazama americana DD
 Dwarf brocket, Mazama chunyi DD
 Gray brocket, Mazama gouazoupira DD
Genus: Ozotoceros
 Pampas deer, Ozotoceros bezoarticus N

Infraclass: Metatheria

Order: Didelphimorphia (common opossums)

Didelphimorphia is the order of common opossums of the Western Hemisphere. Opossums probably diverged from the basic South American marsupials in the late Cretaceous or early Paleocene. They are small to medium-sized marsupials, about the size of a large house cat, with a long snout and prehensile tail.

Family: Didelphidae (American opossums)
Subfamily: Caluromyinae
Genus: Caluromys
 Brown-eared woolly opossum, Caluromys lanatus LR/nt
Genus: Glironia
 Bushy-tailed opossum, Glironia venusta VU
Subfamily: Didelphinae
Genus: Chironectes
 Water opossum, Chironectes minimus LR/nt
Genus: Didelphis
 White-eared opossum, Didelphis albiventris LR/lc
 Common opossum, Didelphis marsupialis LR/lc
Genus: Gracilinanus
 Aceramarca gracile opossum, Gracilinanus aceramarcae LC
 Agile gracile opossum, Gracilinanus agilis LR/nt
Genus: Lutreolina
 Big lutrine opossum, Lutreolina crassicaudata LR/lc
Massoia's lutrine opossum, Lutreolina massoia LC
Genus: Marmosa
 Rufous mouse opossum, Marmosa lepida LR/nt
 Linnaeus's mouse opossum, Marmosa murina LR/lc
 Bare-tailed woolly mouse opossum, Marmosa regina LR/lc
Genus: Marmosops
 Dorothy's slender opossum, Marmosops dorothea VU
 White-bellied slender opossum, Marmosops noctivagus LR/lc
Genus: Metachirus
 Brown four-eyed opossum, Metachirus nudicaudatus LR/lc
Genus: Monodelphis
 Northern red-sided opossum, Monodelphis brevicaudata LR/lc
 Gray short-tailed opossum, Monodelphis domestica LR/lc
 Pygmy short-tailed opossum, Monodelphis kunsi EN
 Osgood's short-tailed opossum, Monodelphis osgoodi VU
Genus: Philander
 Gray four-eyed opossum, Philander opossum LR/lc
Genus: Thylamys
 Elegant fat-tailed mouse opossum, Thylamys elegans LR/lc
 White-bellied fat-tailed mouse opossum, Thylamys pallidior LR/lc
 Common fat-tailed mouse opossum, Thylamys pusillus LR/lc

See also
List of chordate orders
Lists of mammals by region
List of prehistoric mammals
Mammal classification
List of mammals described in the 2000s

Notes

References

Bolivia
Mammals
Mammals of Bolivia
Bolivia